This article provides a list of post-rock bands. The list is not exhaustive, but bands that are added to this list are considered to be notable in the genre.

List

0–9 
 12Twelve
 65daysofstatic

A 
 Aerial M / Papa M
 The Album Leaf
 Aloha
 The American Analog Set
 The American Dollar
 Amiina
 Amp
 And So I Watch You from Afar
 Appliance
 Apse
 The Appleseed Cast
 Arc in Round
 ...as the Poets Affirm
 Ativin

B 
 Balmorhea
 Bardo Pond
 Bark Psychosis
 Battles
 Beaten by Them
 Because of Ghosts
 Bell Orchestre
 Beware of Safety
 The Big Sleep
 Billy Mahonie
 The Black Heart Rebellion
 Bowery Electric
 Brise-Glace
 Broadcast
 Broken Social Scene
 Butterfly Child
 Butterfly Explosion

C 
 Califone
 Caspian
 Činč
 City of the Sun
 Clogs
 Codes in the Clouds
 Collapse Under the Empire
 Collections of Colonies of Bees
 Couch
 Crescent
 Crippled Black Phoenix
 Crows in the Rain 
 Cul de Sac

D 
 The Dead C
 The Declining Winter
 Decoder Ring
 Destroyalldreamers
 Duster
 Dianogah
 Dirty Three
 Disco Inferno
 Do Make Say Think
 Don Caballero
 Dreamend
 Drums & Tuba

E 
 The Edmund Fitzgerald
 Ef
 Efterklang
 Einar Stray Orchestra
 El Ten Eleven
 Electrelane
 Emeralds
 Envy
 Epic45
 Errors
 Esben and the Witch
 Esmerine
 Ester Drang
 The Evpatoria Report
 Explosions in the Sky

F 
 Faunts
 Fifths of Seven
 Fly Pan Am
 Flying Saucer Attack
 The For Carnation
 For a Minor Reflection
 Foxhole
 Fridge
 Friends of Dean Martinez
 From Monument to Masses
 Fuck Buttons
 Füxa

G 
 Ganger
 Gastr del Sol
 Giardini di Mirò
 Gifts from Enola
 God
 God Is an Astronaut
 Godspeed You! Black Emperor
 Goonies Never Say Die
 Grails
 Gregor Samsa

H 
 The Hair and Skin Trading Company
 Hammock
 Hangedup
 Have A Nice Life
 Her Name Is Calla
 High Dependency Unit
 HiM
 Hood
 Hope of the States
 Hrsta

I 
 I Like Trains
 Ice
 If These Trees Could Talk
 Insides
 Isis
 Isotope 217

J 
 Jakob
 Jambinai
 Jeniferever
 Jessamine
 Jesu
 Jónsi
 Joy Wants Eternity
 June of 44
 Junius

K 
 Karate
 Kreidler
 Kauan

L 
 Labradford
 Laika
 Landing
 Lanterna
 Lateduster
 Laura
 Lazlo Hollyfeld
 The Life and Times
 Lights & Motion
 Lights Out Asia
 Logh
 Long Distance Calling
 Long Fin Killie
 Lymbyc Systym

M 
 M83
 Macha
 Magnog
 Magyar Posse
 Main
 Make Believe
 Maserati
 Maybeshewill
 Meanwhile, Back in Communist Russia...
 Menomena
 The Mercury Program
 A Minor Forest
 Mogwai
 Mono
 Roy Montgomery
 Moonlit Sailor
 Moonshake
 Mouse on the Keys
 Movietone
 Moving Mountains
 Múm
 Mutemath
 My Education

N 
 Nedry
 Nordic Giants
 A Northern Chorus

O 
 .O.rang
 O'Brother
 Jim O'Rourke
 Oceansize
 Oh Hiroshima
 On! Air! Library!

P 
 Paul Newman
 Pele
 Pelican
 Pell Mell
 Piano Magic
 Picastro
 Pit er Pat
 Pivot
 port-royal
 Pram
 Precious Fathers
 Sam Prekop
 Pullman
 PVT

R 
 Rachel's
 Radian
 Radiohead
 Red Sparowes
 Redjetson
 The Redneck Manifesto
 Rex
 Riverbeds
 Rodan
 Rosetta
 Rothko
 Russian Circles

S 
 Salvatore
 San Agustin
 Saxon Shore
 Scorn
 The Sea and Cake
 Seam
 Seefeel
 Sennen
 Set Fire to Flames
 The Seven Mile Journey
 The Shadow Project
 Shalabi Effect
 Shipping News
 Shy, Low
 Sigur Rós
 The Six Parts Seven
 Skullflower
 Sleep Party People
 Sleeping People
 sleepmakeswaves
 Slint
 Son Lux
 Sonna
 The Sonora Pine
 Southpacific
 Space Needle
 Special Others
 Sputniks Down
 Stafrænn Hákon
 Stars Like Fleas
 Stars of the Lid
 Stereolab
 Storm & Stress
 Swan Lake
 Swans
 Sweep the Leg Johnny

T 
 Talk Talk
 Talons
 Tarentel
 Tarwater
 Techno Animal
 Thee Silver Mt. Zion Memorial Orchestra
 These New Puritans
 The Third Eye Foundation
 This Is a Process of a Still Life
 This Is Your Captain Speaking
 This Patch of Sky
 This Will Destroy You
 Three Trapped Tigers
 The Timeout Drawer
 To Rococo Rot
 Toe
 Torngat
 Tortoise
 Tracer AMC
 Trans Am
 Tricot
 Tristeza
 Turing Machine

U 
 Ui
 Ulan Bator
 Under Byen
 Unwed Sailor
 U.S. Maple

V 
 Valley of the Giants
 Vessels

W 
 Way Station (band)
 We Lost the Sea
 We Stood Like Kings
 Windsor Airlift
 Windsor for the Derby
 Wires Under Tension
 The World Is a Beautiful Place & I Am No Longer Afraid to Die
 Worriedaboutsatan

Y 
 Yndi Halda
 Youthmovies
 Yume Bitsu

See also 
 List of post-metal bands

References 

Post-rock
 
Post